The West Bolivar Consolidated School District is a public school district based in Rosedale, Mississippi (USA).

It serves sections of Bolivar County. In addition to Rosedale, the district also serves the towns of Gunnison, Beulah, and Pace in western Bolivar County and Benoit and the section of Shaw in southern Bolivar County. It also serves unincorporated areas of Scott, Skene, and Symonds.

History
In 1925, 9-year-old Martha Lum was denied admission to Rosedale Consolidated High School (now West Bolivar High School) because she was Chinese American.  The U.S. Supreme Court upheld the Mississippi's right to exclude her in Lum v. Rice. That decision was overturned by the holding in Brown v. Board of Education in 1954.

Beginning in 1986 Benoit School District students did not attend Ray Brooks School (previously Nugent Center School, a.k.a. Benoit High School), but instead West Bolivar High School. However high school classes at Ray Brooks resumed in 2000. Linda Coleman, a Democratic member of the Mississippi House of Representatives from Mound Bayou, stated that the costs of transporting children to West Bolivar from Benoit were too high.

In 2012 the Mississippi Legislature passed a bill that required five school districts in Bolivar County to consolidate into two larger ones. On July 1, 2014, the Benoit School District, Shaw School District, and West Bolivar School District consolidated into the West Bolivar Consolidated School District. The former three districts were abolished under the law with a new one formed.

In 2017 there were at least 19 people applying to be the district's superintendent.

Governance
The board has two members from the Rosedale area, two members from the Shaw area, and one from the Benoit area.

Schools
 PK-12: McEvans Warriors K-12 School (Shaw) (merger of McEvans Elementary and Shaw High School)
 7-12: West Bolivar High School (Rosedale)
 PK-6: West Bolivar Elementary School (Rosedale)
 Joe Barnes Career Technical Center (Rosedale)

 Former schools
 PK-12: Ray Brooks School (near Benoit) (closed 2020)
 West Bolivar Middle School (Rosedale)
 In 2020 the district decided to move West Bolivar High into the West Bolivar Middle building. at 1213 South Main Street. West Bolivar High moved to Building B. Now West Bolivar High is a unified 7-12 school, at the former middle school campus.

Demographics

2006-07 school year
There were a total of 1,014 students enrolled in the West Bolivar School District during the 2006–2007 school year. The gender makeup of the district was 48% female and 52% male. The racial makeup of the district was 95.86% African American, 3.35% White, and 0.79% Hispanic. 88.5% of the district's students were eligible to receive free lunch.

Previous school years

Accountability statistics

See also
List of school districts in Mississippi

References

Further reading
Map of Bolivar County School Districts as of 2010 - U.S. Census Bureau
Legislation from the Mississippi Legislature requiring the Bolivar County school district consolidations
Ruling from the  U.S. Department of Justice about the Bolivar County school district consolidations
Maps of old and new districts with new board districts

External links

Education in Bolivar County, Mississippi
School districts in Mississippi
School districts established in 2014
2014 establishments in Mississippi